Derrick Worsley is an American actor. He appeared in the movie Taken 3 as Officer Edwards. Worsley has also appeared on the television programs, Nashville, The Haves and Have Nots, I Want That, Satisfaction, and Survivor Remorse, and played Coach Jones on Being Mary Jane. Derrick is married to Crystal Worsley (2003) and they have three children.

Filmography

Film
 All Eyez on Me (2017)
 Leavey (2016)
 Proverbs (2016)
 Sleepless Night (2016)
 Taken 3 (2015)

Television
 Being Mary Jane (2016)
 Nashville (2013-2014)
 Survivor Remorse (2014)
 Satisfaction (2014)
 The Haves and Have Nots (2014)
 I Want That (2013)

References

External links

21st-century American male actors
Living people
Place of birth missing (living people)
Year of birth missing (living people)
American male film actors
American male television actors